The Elmore County Courthouse is a historic building in Mountain Home, Idaho, and the courthouse of Elmore County, Idaho. It was built in 1916 by C. E. Johnson with sandstone from Boise, and it was designed in the Classical Revival style by Wayland and Fennel. The construction was completed 17 years after the establishment of Elmore County. It has been listed on the National Register of Historic Places since September 22, 1987.

References

Courthouses on the National Register of Historic Places in Idaho
National Register of Historic Places in Elmore County, Idaho
Neoclassical architecture in Idaho
Government buildings completed in 1916